Mabalacat City College (MCC) is an institution of higher learning funded and managed by the Mabalacat City government, Pampanga, Philippines.

History 
Mabalacat City College was established during the administration of former Mabalacat Mayor, Marino P. Morales. 

After a series of feasibility studies, it was formally opened  in September 2008. The legal foundation of the college was formulated by the SB members. On October 4, 2008, Municipal Ordinance No. 2, series of 2007 entitled "An ordinance establishing a local College in the Municipality of Mabalacat to be known as the Mabalacat City College and granting its charter providing for the Rules, Regulations and Pertinent Guidelines for its establishment and operation thereof," was passed.

On January 14, 2008,  Former Mayor Morales appointed Dr. Leonardo C. Canlas as the first ad interim president of the college. The initial courses offered were BS in Elementary Education, BS in Secondary Education with major fields in mathematics and biological science, and BS in information technology.

Currently, the school offers 18 courses in its 5 Institutes.

Academic departments 
Institute of Teacher Education (ITE)
Courses Offered:
Bachelor of Early Childhood Education.
Bachelor of Elementary Education
Bachelor of Physical Education
Bachelor of Secondary Education, Major in English
Bachelor of Secondary Education, Major in Filipino
Bachelor of Secondary Education, Major in Math
Bachelor of Secondary Education, Major in Science
Bachelor of Secondary Education, Major in Social Studies
Bachelor of Secondary Education, Major in Values Education
Bachelor of Technical- Vocational Teacher Education
Institute of Computing Studies (ICS)
Courses Offered:
Bachelor of Science in Information Teachnology
Associate in Computer Technology
Institute of Hospitality Management (IHM)
Courses Offered:
Bachelor of Science in Hospitality Management
Bachelor of Science in Tourism Management
Institute of Arts and Sciences (IAS)
Courses Offered:
Bachelor of Arts in History
Bachelor of Science in Biology
Institute of Business Education (IBE)
Courses Offered:
Bachelor of Science in Accountancy
Bachelor of Science in Customs Administration

References

External links
 

Universities and colleges in Pampanga
Local colleges and universities in the Philippines
Education in Mabalacat
Educational institutions established in 2007
2007 establishments in the Philippines